Matthew Keith Sheldon-Collins (born 13 April 1963 in Melbourne, Victoria) is an Australian baseball player. He represented Australia at the 1988 and 1996 Summer Olympics.

References

1963 births
Olympic baseball players of Australia
Australian baseball players
Baseball players at the 1996 Summer Olympics
Living people
Sportspeople from Melbourne
Baseball players at the 1988 Summer Olympics